Laurence A. Tosi (born 1968) is an American entrepreneur, investor, and philanthropist. Tosi is currently Managing Partner of WestCap Group, the investment firm he founded. In October 2020, it was reported that Tosi's firm was in the final stages of raising a $750 million fund and had received about $1.2 billion of investor interest to date. Prior to dedicating his time to WestCap, Tosi served as the chief financial officer of Airbnb and of The Blackstone Group and held several roles at BofA Merrill Lynch.

Early life and education
Laurence Tosi was born on February 8, 1968. He put himself through school to get his bachelor's degree in 1990 and JD./M.B.A. in 1994 from Georgetown University, which he called a financial "struggle." Tosi has become a major donor to the school and to the 1789 scholarship fund.

Business career
After law school, Tosi practiced litigation and corporate law at Donovan, Leisure, Newton & Irvine; and then went to work for General Electric as the director of business development for GE's CNBC and NBC divisions. He then worked for Merrill Lynch as chief operating officer of their trading and investment banking division. In June 2008, he became CFO of the Blackstone Group. In January 2011, Tosi was offered the job of CFO at Apple by Steve Jobs, but turned it down. Apple had a large amount of cash reserves, and felt that Tosi would bring acquisition experience. Before joining Airbnb, Tosi was on the short list of Blackstone senior executives being groomed to take over the role of Chief Executive when Stephen Schwarzman retires.

Tosi served as CFO at Airbnb from July 2015 until he left in February 2018. He left the company to dedicate a greater amount of time and energy to his investment fund, Weston Capital Partners, and to dedicate additional time to the several boards of which he was a member.

References

External links
Blackstone.com

1968 births
Living people
American chief financial officers
Georgetown University alumni
Georgetown University Law Center alumni
Corporate lawyers
General Electric people
Merrill (company) people
The Blackstone Group people
McDonough School of Business alumni